Al Kennedy Alternative High School is a public alternative high school in Cottage Grove, Oregon, United States. The curriculum is organized around the core theme of sustainability and stewardship.

Student learning
Kennedy organizes its learning around aspiration, engagement, and experiential learning:

 Students cultivate their personal identities as "global citizens" who are contributing to a sustainable future.
 There is an emphasis on solutions to challenges of sustainability.   Sustainability themes are integrated in each core curriculum area.
 Students are connected with adult practice communities that are engaged in sustainable development activities.
 Large amounts of curriculum are organized around experiential and service learning.  Activities like conservation management, organic farming and forestry, environmental monitoring, and mapping support key curriculum elements.

Kennedy focus: five educational domains
The school is "dedicated to creating future leaders in the area of sustainability as well as well-rounded academics."

Sustainable agriculture
Kennedy High School incorporates organic farming practices into a curriculum designed to involve students in the organic farming/agricultural process, from testing soil samples, planting and growing crops, measuring outcomes, and marketing.

In 2008 Kennedy partnered with Healing Harvest, a nonprofit organization based in Cottage Grove, to design and build organic gardens at elementary schools across South Lane District, including a master garden on campus.

Sustainable architecture
The school engages in sustainable architecture activities, which teach students the historical aspects of alternative building practice, while participating in local building projects such as a sustainable housing prototype for low-income communities.

Sustainable forestry
The school works with local landowners to manage their forested and open lands for future generations. Students immerse themselves in all aspects of land stewardship, including walking the land with owners, figuring the trigonometry of easement boundaries, rebuilding animal habitat for local fauna while inventorying forest species, working with local conservation agencies to draft management plans, and helping land owners to implement those plans.

Sustainable energy
Kennedy High School partners closely with Lane Community College's Energy Management Program. In the winter trimester of 2009, Kennedy began a College Now course, "Sustainability 101″, which offers students an opportunity to work with college and high school instructors in studying conservation and energy systems.

Sustainable community
Kennedy High School's community-based projects help students and community members gain the skills and resources they need to find solutions to sustainability.

Kennedy Conservation Crew
The Kennedy Conservation Corps engages students in the workings of regional and national conservation organizations. Kennedy has engaged in a number of fee-for-service projects with the U.S. Forest Service, Coast Fork Willamette Watershed Council, and private landowners.

Apiary
The school has installed three beehives on campus in March 2010 to start a beekeeping program.  The Kennedy Apiary promotes vegetable growth in the neighboring community garden, and the beehives allow students to get hands-on experience studying the ecology of the honeybee.

Academics
In 2008, 44% of the school's seniors received a high school diploma. Of 48 students, 21 graduated, 21 dropped out, and six were still in high school in 2009.

References

Alternative schools in Oregon
High schools in Lane County, Oregon
Cottage Grove, Oregon
Public high schools in Oregon